HMS Sword is a fictional experimental submarine of the British Royal Navy in Jules Verne's 1896 novel Facing the Flag.

Description

As described by Verne, Sword was a "submersible boat of only twelve tons", carrying a crew of four and commanded by a lieutenant. Her screw was worked by a couple of dynamos fitted with accumulators that needed to be charged in port, and which enabled her to cruise for only one or two days. She was divided into three watertight compartments. The aft one contained the accumulators and machinery. The middle, occupied by the pilot, was surmounted by a periscope fitted with lenticular portholes through which an electric search-lamp lighted the way through the water. The forward compartment was used for passengers.

In the 1890s, Sword was in the Port of St. George at the Bahamas when authorities found the pirate Ker Karraje had established himself in a cavern, accessible only by submarine, on the desolate neighboring island of Back Cup. Karraje had with him the French inventor, Thomas Roch, who agreed to give a powerful new explosive to the pirate. The news had arrived through a message placed in a keg by the engineer, Simon Hart, held captive in the pirate stronghold.

Sword, under Lt Devon, was sent to penetrate the stronghold and take Roch and Hart aboard. This Devon and his men did, but before they could get away they were discovered by the bigger pirate submarine and sunk. The British crew perished while Roch and Hart were recovered by pirate divers, to take part in the cataclysmic end of the story. Verne conceived submarine fighting as mainly ramming.

The book was written when Verne was well-disposed towards the British (his attitude fluctuated). Lt Devon is a noble and heroic officer, the equal of naval heroes in books by British writers.

The Royal Navy did, in 1943, give the name "Sword" to a surface ship being laid out at Newport News, Virginia, to be delivered to Britain as part of lend-lease. However, before it was completed the deal was off and the ship was delivered to the United States Navy, commissioned in 1944 as USS Rushmore. She had a long and distinguished career.

In film
The Sword appears in The Fabulous World of Jules Verne, a 1958 film by Karel Zeman based in Facing the Flag.

See also
 Nautilus, another submarine in Verne's works.

External links
 Complete translated text of the novel from Project Gutenberg (English)

Fictional submarines
Jules Verne
Fictional ships of the Royal Navy